Arthur MacArthur Sr. (January 26, 1815August 26, 1896) was a Scottish-American immigrant, lawyer, and judge.  He was the fourth Governor of Wisconsin and was an associate justice of the Supreme Court of the District of Columbia. He was the father of General Arthur MacArthur Jr., and the grandfather of General Douglas MacArthur.  MacArthur is the modern spelling used by his descendants, but in documents from his own time his name was spelled McArthur.

Education and career

Arthur MacArthur was born on January 26, 1815, in Glasgow, Scotland. His parents were both MacArthurs from the western Scottish Highlands, but his father died before his birth.  His mother, Sarah, remarried to Alexander Meggett, and, in 1828, the family migrated to the United States, settling near Uxbridge, Massachusetts.

MacArthur attended Uxbridge and Amherst, but left school to help the family during the depression of 1837.  He eventually graduated from Wesleyan University, in Connecticut, in 1840. He studied law in New York, and was admitted to the New York Bar in 1841. He also became interested in politics while in New York, joining the Democratic Party.

While in New York, he met and fell in love with Aurelia Belcher, who convinced him to move to Massachusetts.  He entered private practice in Springfield, Massachusetts, and, in 1843, was a public administrator in Hampden County. Around 1844, he married Aurelia, and, with financial assistance from her father, expanded his law practice.  He successfully practiced law in New York and Massachusetts for several years, and, in 1849, moved with his wife and son to Milwaukee, in the new state of Wisconsin.

Wisconsin public offices

In Wisconsin, MacArthur continued practicing law from 1849 to 1851, and resumed his interest in politics with the Democratic Party in the city.  In 1851, he became City Attorney for Milwaukee.  In the 1855 election, MacArthur was the Democratic Party nominee for Lieutenant Governor of Wisconsin, running alongside incumbent Governor William A. Barstow.  He defeated Republican Charles Sholes, of Kenosha, to become the 5th Lieutenant Governor of the state.

1855 election dispute

The 1855 election, however, also produced a controversy with the apparent re-election of Barstow by a mere 157 votes.  Barstow's Republican opponent, Wisconsin state senator Coles Bashford, claimed fraud and challenged the results.  On January 7, 1856, both Bashford and Barstow were sworn in as Governor of Wisconsin in separate ceremonies.

The outgoing Attorney General, George Baldwin Smith, filed quo warranto proceedings to have Barstow removed, and the case Atty. Gen. ex rel. Bashford v. Barstow soon reached the Wisconsin Supreme Court.  Barstow initially attempted to challenge the jurisdiction of the court over election results, but eventually relented, and, on March 21, 1856, sent his resignation to the Wisconsin Legislature.

MacArthur, therefore, became the acting Governor of Wisconsin.  Four days later, the Wisconsin Supreme Court unanimously decided in favor of Bashford, ruling that the results from several precincts from remote northern counties appeared fraudulent.  MacArthur, though he had at first decided to hold the governor's office regardless of the court's decision, reconsidered and relinquished the governorship to Bashford.

He resumed his duties as Lieutenant Governor, and officially remained in this position until the end of his term, January 1858.

Wisconsin circuit court

In 1856, Wisconsin Circuit Court Judge Levi Hubbell had resigned his seat on the 2nd Circuit, covering Milwaukee and Waukesha counties.  Alexander Randall had been appointed to temporarily fill the seat, but a new election was scheduled for April 1857 to fill the remainder of the term.  Randall did not run in the election for a full term; MacArthur, while serving as Lieutenant Governor, ran for and was elected to the position without opposition, taking office the following year.  He was re-elected in 1863 and resigned in the fall of 1869.

Washington, D.C.

Federal judicial service

MacArthur was nominated by President Ulysses S. Grant on July 15, 1870, to the Supreme Court of the District of Columbia (now the United States District Court for the District of Columbia), to a new Associate Justice seat authorized by 16 Stat. 160. He was confirmed by the United States Senate on July 15, 1870, and received his commission the same day. He served on the court for 17 years, and retired on April 1, 1887.

Later life

MacArthur remained a prominent member of Washington, D.C., society in his later years.  He was a strong supporter of the National University, and served as a trustee, president of the Board of Regents, and Chancellor of the university.  He was also President of the Society for Prevention of Cruelty to Animals and Children.

Family

Around 1844, MacArthur married Aurelia Belcher (1819–1864), the daughter of a wealthy industrialist. They had two sons, Arthur Jr., born in Chicopee Falls, Massachusetts, in 1845, and Frank, born in Wisconsin in 1853.

At the outbreak of the American Civil War, Arthur Jr., then sixteen, became passionate about the Union cause.  MacArthur appealed directly to President Abraham Lincoln to secure an appointment for Arthur Jr. to the United States Military Academy, but the boy was so eager to join the Union cause, he deferred the academy to volunteer for service.  MacArthur assisted his then-seventeen-year-old son in obtaining a commission as an adjutant and first lieutenant in the 24th Wisconsin Volunteer Infantry Regiment, under Colonel Charles H. Larrabee. Arthur Jr. went on to win the Medal of Honor for his actions in the Civil War, and pursued a career in the Army, eventually rising to the rank of Lieutenant General (three star), and serving as American Governor-General of the Philippines. Arthur Jr. was also the father of American five-star General and World War II hero Douglas MacArthur.

After the death of his wife, Aurelia, MacArthur married Mary E. (Willcut) Hopkins (1824–1899), the widow of Benjamin F. Hopkins.

Death

MacArthur died on August 26, 1896, in Atlantic City, New Jersey.

Electoral history

Wisconsin Lieutenant Governor (1855)

| colspan="6" style="text-align:center;background-color: #e9e9e9;"| General Election, November 6, 1855

See also
 List of U.S. state governors born outside the United States

References

Further reading

External links
 

1815 births
1896 deaths
Democratic Party governors of Wisconsin
Politicians from Milwaukee
Judges of the United States District Court for the District of Columbia
Lieutenant Governors of Wisconsin
Wisconsin state court judges
Wisconsin city attorneys
Arthur Sr.
Scottish emigrants to the United States
Politicians from Glasgow
Politicians from Springfield, Massachusetts
Wesleyan University alumni
United States federal judges appointed by Ulysses S. Grant
19th-century American judges
Massachusetts lawyers
New York (state) lawyers
Wisconsin lawyers
Burials at Rock Creek Cemetery